Christian Enemark (born 20 January 1999) is a Danish professional footballer who plays as centre-back for Danish 1st Division club Næstved Boldklub.

Career

Brøndby
Born in Køge, Enemark started playing football at Herfølge Boldklub, the motherclub of HB Køge, and was promoted to HB Køge's U17 squad although he was a U15 player. On 15 January 2015, he was sold to Brøndby IF at the age of 15.

On 21 May 2017, Enemark made his official debut for Brøndby IF in a match against SønderjyskE where he played the entire game at right-back. The club announced on 8 January 2018, that Enemark had been permanently promoted to the first team together with goalkeeper Casper Hauervig. Enemark normal position was at centre back but he was promoted because the first team was missing a right back.

HB Køge (loan)
On 3 August 2018, Enemark was loaned out to his childhood club, HB Køge, in the second-tier 1st Division until the end of the season. Enemark had not made many appearances for Brøndby due to tough competition in defense. At the end of his loan spell at HB Køge, it was announced that Enemark would not receive a permanent contract with the club because the coaching staff failed to agree on the position in which he would be utilised. Enemark saw himself as a centre back, while the club wanted to use him as a right back.

On 7 June 2019, Brøndby announced that Enemark would leave the club following the return from his loan spell at HB Køge, as his contract with the club expired.

Næstved
On 11 June 2019, it was confirmed, that Enemark had joined 1st Division club Næstved Boldklub.

AB
On 29 August 2020, Enemark moved to Akademisk Boldklub (AB) in the third-tier 2nd Division. There, he was appointed vice-captain and gained the award of "Player of the Year".

Return to Næstved
In June 2021, it was announced that Enemark would return to Næstved.

References

External links
Profile at the Næstved Boldklub website

1999 births
Living people
People from Køge Municipality
Sportspeople from Region Zealand
Danish men's footballers
Danish Superliga players
Danish 1st Division players
Danish 2nd Division players
Brøndby IF players
HB Køge players
Næstved Boldklub players
Akademisk Boldklub players
Association football defenders